Lake Manych-Gudilo is a large saltwater reservoir lake in Kalmykia, Russia. Part of the lake lies also in Rostov Oblast and Stavropol Krai. It has an area of about 344 km² and average depth of only about 0.6 m.

Lake Manych-Gudilo is the source of the West Manych River, which flows north-west, through a number of reservoirs, falling into the lower Don a short distance upstream from Rostov-on-Don and the Don's fall into the Sea of Azov.

The area is also home to many species of birds and is the site of the Chernye Zemli Biosphere Reserve.

A global sea level rise of roughly  would cause the ocean surface to be higher than the highest point of an area between the ocean and the Caspian, forming a narrow channel straddling the lake in the area between the Sea of Azov and the Caspian Sea, potentially placing the Caspian Depression area under water.

See also

Further reading

References

Manych Gudilo
Manych Gudilo
Ramsar sites in Russia
Manych Gudilo
Manych Gudilo
Manych Gudilo
Don basin